In Greek mythology, Maera (Ancient Greek: Μαῖρα means 'the sparkler') was the hound of Erigone, daughter of Icarius of Athens.

Mythology 
Icarius was a follower of the wine god Dionysus and had been taught how to make wine. While travelling, Icarius met some shepherds and gave them wine; they became intoxicated and believed Icarius had poisoned them, so they killed him. Erigone was worried about her father, and set off with Maera to find him. Maera led her to his grave, and both became so overwhelmed with grief that she hung herself and Maera leapt off a cliff. Upon hearing the news, Dionysus was angry and punished Athens with a plague, inflicting insanity on all the unmarried women, who all hung themselves, imitating Erigone. The plague did not cease until the Athenians introduced honorific rites for Icarius and Erigone. Zeus or Dionysus placed Icarius, Erigone and Maera in the sky as the constellations Virgo (Erigone),  Boötes (Icarius), and the star, Procyon (Maera).

Notes

References 
 Gaius Julius Hyginus, Astronomica from The Myths of Hyginus translated and edited by Mary Grant. University of Kansas Publications in Humanistic Studies. Online version at the Topos Text Project.

Mythological dogs
Deeds of Zeus
Attic mythology